Lightwood may refer to:

Trees 
 Acacia implexa, Australian tree
 Fatwood, the resinous core of the pine tree, in the Southern United States

Places

United Kingdom 
 Lightwood, Stoke-on-Trent, Staffordshire 
 Lightwood, Derbyshire 
 Lightwood, Ditton Priors, Shropshire 
 Lightwood, Hinstock, Shropshire 
 Lightwood, Staffordshire Moorlands, Staffordshire 
 Lightwood Reservoir, in Derbyshire

United States 
 Lightwood, Alabama, United States, a place in Elmore County
 Lightwood House, plantation house in Virginia

People with the name 
 Ray Lightwood (1922–2001), British medical engineer
 Reginald Cyril Lightwood, writing in 1935, namesake of Lightwood–Albright syndrome
Simon Lightwood (born 1979/1980), British politician

Fictional characters 
 Alec Lightwood and Isabelle Lightwood, from The Mortal Instruments novels by Cassandra Clare
 Maryse, Max and Robert Lightwood, secondary characters from the same novels

Other uses 
 Lightwood, 1939 novel by Brainard Cheney
 Lightwood's law, in paediatric medicine
 Lightwood Hoard, found near Lightwood, Stoke-on-Trent